Souk En Nhas (English: copper market) is one of the souks of the medina of Tunis. It is specialised in selling copper utensils.

Location 

The souk location is between the Kasbah Street and Souk El Grana.

Testimonies 

Charles Lallemand visited Tunisia in the end of the 19th century and left a testimony about the souk.

Notes and references

External links 
 

Nhas